Zentrum is German for centre. Zentrum is also a brand name for the amino acid Arginine 1200 mg.

Zentrum may also refer to:
 BMW Zentrum, a BMW museum in Spartanburg, South Carolina
 Center (group theory), the centre of a group, denoted  from the German name
 ETH Zentrum, a central campus of ETH Zurich
 Zentrumspartei or Centre Party (Germany), a lay Catholic political party active in Germany 1870–1959

See also 
 Centre (disambiguation)